Lonar Lake, also known as Lonar crater, is a notified National Geo-heritage Monument, saline, soda lake, located at Lonar in Buldhana district, Maharashtra, India. Lonar Lake is an astrobleme created by a meteorite impact during the Pleistocene Epoch. It is one of only four known hyper-velocity impact craters in basaltic rock anywhere on Earth. The other three basaltic impact structures are in southern Brazil.

Lonar Crater sits inside the Deccan Plateaua massive plain of volcanic basalt rock created by eruptions some 65 million years ago. Its location in this basalt field suggested to some geologists that it was a volcanic crater. Today, however, Lonar Crater is understood to be the result of a meteorite impact. The water in the lake is both saline and alkaline.

Geologists, ecologists, archaeologists, naturalists and astronomers have published studies on various aspects of the ecosystem of this crater lake.

Although the crater's age was previously estimated to be 52,000 ± 6,000 years, newer studies suggest an age of 576,000 ± 47,000 years.

The Smithsonian Institution, the United States Geological Survey, Geological Survey of India, the University of Sagar and the Physical Research Laboratory have conducted extensive studies of the site. Biological nitrogen fixation was discovered in this lake in 2007.

A 2019 study, conducted by IIT Bombay found that the minerals in the lake soil are very similar to the minerals found in moon rocks brought back during the Apollo Program. The lake was declared a protected Ramsar site in November 2020.

Geographical features 

A series of small hills surround the basin, which has an oval shape, almost round, with a circumference at top of about 8 km (five miles). The sides of the basin rise abruptly at an angle of about 75°. At the base of the sides, the lake has a circumference of about 4.8 km (three miles). The slopes are covered with tree-savannah, housing teak (Tectona grandis), Wrightia tinctoria, Butea monosperma, and Helicteres isora, and with shrub-savannah housing Acacia nilotica and Ziziphus spp.. Along the lake shore, non-native Prosopis juliflora is spreading. Millet, maize, okra, banana, and papaya are the main cultivated crops.

The water of the lake contains various salts and sodas. During dry weather, when evaporation reduces the water level, large quantities of soda are collected. Two small streams, named Purna and Penganga, drain into the lake, and a well of fresh water is located on the southern side, close to the water's edge.

Geological origin 

Lonar Lake lies within the only known extraterrestrial impact crater found within the great Deccan Traps, a huge basaltic formation in India. The lake was initially believed to be of volcanic origin, but now it is recognized as an impact crater. Lonar Lake was created by the impact of either a comet or of an asteroid. The presence of plagioclase that has been either converted into maskelynite or contains planar deformation features has confirmed the impact origin of this crater. It is believed that only shock metamorphism caused by a hypervelocity impact can transform plagioclase into maskelynite, or create planar deformation features. The presence of impact deformation of basalt layers comprising the rim, of shocked breccia inside the crater, of shatter cones, and of the non-volcanic ejecta blanket surrounding the crater all support the impact origin of Lonar Lake.

The crater has an oval shape. The meteorite impact came from the east, at an angle of 35 to 40 degrees.

There are various estimates of the age of the crater. Earlier thermoluminescence analyses gave a result of 52,000 years, while recent argon-argon dating suggests that the crater is much older; it could be 570 000 ± 47 000 years old. This greater age is in line with the degree of erosion of the crater rim.

As a result of the studies, the geological features of the Lonar crater have been divided into five distinguishable zones, exhibiting distinct geomorphic characteristics.
The five zones are:

 The outermost ejecta blanket
 The crater rim
 The slopes of the crater
 The crater basin, excluding lake
 The crater lake

History 
The lake was first mentioned in ancient scriptures such as the Skanda Purana and the Padma Purana.

The Ain-i-Akbari, a document written about 1600 CE, states:
These mountains produce all the requisites for making glass and soap. And here are saltpetre works which yield a considerable revenue to the State, from the duties collected. On these mountains is a spring of salt water, but the water from the centre and the edges is perfectly fresh.

Buldhana district in Maharashtra, where the lake is located, was once part of the Maurya Empire and then part of the Satavahana Empire. The Chalukyas and Rashtrakutas also ruled this area. During the period of the Mughals, Yadavas, Nizam, and the British, trade prospered in this area. Several temples found on the periphery of the Lake are known as Yadava temples and also as Hemadpanti temples (named after Hemadri Ramgaya).

In 2022, the government of Maharashtra began plans to develop the site as a tourist attraction.

Ambar Lake 
There is a Hanuman temple near this lake, with the idol made of rock believed to be highly magnetic. The water from Ambar lake is being drained by local farmers. This lake is sometimes also called Chhota (little) Lonar.

By-products of the lake 
The Gazetteer chronicles the findings of the British administrators and scientists, notably, Colonel Mackenzie, scientist Dr. I. B. Lyon, J.O.Malcolmson and Plymen, agricultural chemist. Some extracts from Plymen's report, given in quotes, are informative.
The saline deposits obtained from the lake are rather of an exceptional nature. Compared with the most famous salt lake in India, the Sambhar Lake in Rajsthan (India), it will be seen that whereas at Lonar the carbonates of soda are the most important, in the case of the Sambhar Lake the deposits of sodium chloride or common salt give the lake its value. The modes of formation are also entirely different and it is practically certain that the Lonar salts are derived from an unknown source in the bed of the lake. It is true that water is continually flowing into the lake and that except by evaporation there is no loss. The main feeder stream could not however supply this amount of alkali nor could the other smaller supplies coming in during the rains, for on all sides of the lake vegetation is abundant, particularly where the main stream flows in continuously. Were any quantity of alkali present in this water, vegetation would suffer considerably and, with exception of a few varieties of plants, eventually die out entirely.
The salts collected from this lake vary in their nature and composition and from their-appearance are easily separated by men accustomed to handling them. Various names are given to some five or six main varieties, but there is no fixed line between one salt and another, their compositions depending upon the period and condition of crystallization. At the present time large quantities of these salts are lying on the shores of the lake...

With the process of crystallization, sodium chloride or common salt is formed along with the carbonates of soda resulting in a number of products, as explained below.

Kala Namak and Nimak Dalla are found in white crystalline masses. Khuppal is obtained in solid compact lumps and consists of a mixture of carbonates and chlorides in roughly equal proportions. Pipadi or Papri, which has a similar chemical composition, is very different in appearance. It is frequently tinged, slightly pink in colour and hollow air spaces are found between the crystalline masses which are formed in flakes or layers. Bhuski has no definite structure but consists of a soft flaky powder mixed with a quantity of impurity. It can be compared to small salt substance or baking soda.
The salts are not all obtained in the same way or at the same period of the year. Pipadi and Bhuski are deposited on the shores of the lake as the water dries up in the hot weather, Pipadi being the upper layer and therefore the purer. Except for Bhuski the salts are in a fairly pure state and contain only small proportions of earthy matter. Their further purification is not considered difficult.

Commercial exploitation of the salts from the lake is recorded from 1842, including the period of Government of Nizam, and until 1903. Presently, there is only a very small local demand for these Lonar Lake products.

Gaylussite mineral
Gaylussite is the mineral has been recently reported from drill core in Lonar lake. Gaylussite is a carbonate mineral, a hydrated sodium calcium carbonate, formula Na2Ca(CO3)2·5H2O. It occurs as translucent, vitreous white to grey to yellow monoclinic prismatic crystals. It is an unstable mineral which dehydrates in dry air and decomposes in water.

Streptomyces alkalithermotolerans is an alkaliphilic and thermotolerant bacterium species from the genus of Streptomyces which has been isolated from the Lonar soda lake in India.

Lake ecosystem 
The chemical characteristics of the lake shows two distinct regions that do not mix – an outer neutral (pH 7) and an inner alkaline (pH 11) each with its own flora and fauna.The lake is a haven for a wide range of plant and animal life.

The site has 160 bird, 46 reptile and 12 mammal species. Resident and migratory birds such as black-winged stilts, brahminy ducks, grebes, shelducks (European migrants), shovelers, teals, herons, red-wattled lapwings, rollers or blue jays, baya weavers, parakeets, hoopoes, larks, tailorbirds, magpies, robins and swallows are found on the lake.

Among reptiles, the monitor lizard is reported to be prominent. The lake is also home to thousands of peafowls, chinkara and gazelles.

Microbial diversity 

While the Lonar Lake appears green for most of the year due to the presence of dense blooms of cyanobacteria such as Arthrospira spp., bacteria and archaea belonging to diverse functional groups such as methanogens, methanotrophs, phototrophs, denitrifiers, sulfur oxidizers, sulfate reducers, heterotrophs and syntrophs have been reported. Diverse alveolates, fungi, stramenopiles, choanoflagellates, amoebozoans and cercozoans, and many novel lineages of putative micro-eukaryotes were detected in molecular surveys of Lonar Lake sediments. Gene sequences of ciliated protozoans such as Oxytricha longa and fungi belonging to Candida spp. were also recovered from lake sediment microcosms containing enriched populations of methylotrophic bacteria. A new species of fungus Curvularia lonarensis has been described from the lake.

Noteworthy functional groups of microorganisms:

Methylotrophic microorganisms
Methylotrophs belonging to Methylomicrobium, Methylophaga and Bacillus species have been identified in the Lonar Lake sediments. Methane-oxidizing methylotrophs (methanotrophs) were also detected in the surface scum atop the lake water-column. A novel species of non-methane-utilizing methylotroph Methylophaga lonarensis was isolated in pure culture from lake sediment microcosms. This haloalkaliphilic bacterium synthesizes and intracellularly accumulates organic solutes such as ectoine that are of biotechnological interest. Methylotrophic methanogenesis has been reported in Lonar Lake sediments and the primary microorganism (archaeon) that is responsible was identified as being closely related to Methanolobus oregonensis.

Endolithic microorganisms
Endolithic bacteria belonging to the phyla Actinobacteria, Acidobacteria, Proteobacteria, Firmicutes, Cyanobacteria and Bacteroidetes, and endolithic archaea belonging to the phyla Thaumarchaeota and Euryarchaeota were detected in Lonar basalt rock samples that were retrieved from the crater walls and the lake-bed. The diversity and richness of endolithic bacteria in these samples were estimated to be higher than that of endolithic archaea. Most of the detected endolithic prokaryotes were identified as being putative methanotrophs, methanogens, phototrophs, ammonia-oxidizers, nitrogen-fixers, denitrifiers, dissimilatory sulfate-reducers and metal-reducers.

Nitrogen-fixing microorganisms
Nonsymbiotic nitrogen-fixing microorganisms such as Halomonas sp., Paracoccus sp., Klebsiella sp., Slackia sp., and Actinopolyspora sp. have been reported from this lake. All the nitrogen fixers are haloalkaliphilic in nature as they can grow only at pH-11. Some of the bacteria and actinomycetes isolated from this lake are able to grow on some components of inorganic medium containing martian soil simulant components.

2020 color change

In early June 2020, the lake turned red/pink in a span of 2–3 days. Reports by Agharkar Research Institute, National Environmental Engineering Research Institute and Geological Survey of India suggested that lowered water levels and high salinity caused growth of Halobacterium and increased Carotenoid levels, which in turn led to color change.

Religious setting 
Numerous temples surround the lake, most of which stand in ruins today, except for the temple of Daitya Sudan at the centre of the Lonar town, which was built in honour of Vishnu's victory over the giant Lonasur. It is a fine example of early Hindu architecture. Vishnumandir, Wagh Mahadev, Mora Mahadev, Munglyacha Mandir and Goddess Kamalaja Devia are the other temples found inside the crater.

Daitya Sudan temple 

Daitya Sudan Temple is a Vishnu temple dated to the Chalukya Dynasty which ruled Central and Southern India between the 6th and 12th centuries. It belongs to the Hemadpanthi class and is built in the form of an irregular star. It features carvings similar to those seen at Khajuraho temples. The deity of this temple is made of an ore with a high metal content that resembles stone. The ceiling of the temple has carvings. The exterior walls are also covered with carved figures.

The temple of Daitya Sudan at Lonar is the best example of the Hemadpanthi style. From the standing image of Surya in the principal niche on the back of the temple, it is conjectured that the temple was originally dedicated to the Sun god. However, in the present form its vaishnav temple of god Vishnu in its daityasudan avatar. There is a story that a demon by the name of Lonasur or Lavanasur used to reside in this locality along with his sisters. He was killed by lord Vishnu in his Daityasudan Avatar hence the name.

It is a tree chamber temple, the inner most being garbh gruh, the sanctum sanctorum, where the idol of lord vishnu standing atop Lavanasur is there. The present day idol was made by Bholse rulers of Nagpur after the original went missing. The second chamber is called antarl where individual pooja are performed, on the roof of this block one can see beautiful cravings of puranic stories viz. The killing of Lavanasur by Lord Krishna and appearance of Dhar of Lonar; story of Kansa and Krishna, story of Narasimha and HiranKashyap and lastly raskrida. The outermost chamber is called as sabhamandap which is meant for group offerings and performance. This portion as well as the entrance gate does not match the style and construction elements of the temple overall. The brickwork might have been added later to the damaged or unfinished temple, which may be attributed to various invasions post the 10th century.

The main entrance of the temple is east facing. The principle niche at the back of the temple has an image of Surya, the sun god, which gives rise to the speculation that this might have been dedicated to him. The niche on south has an image of Chamunda. The one on left of the temple i.e. north has Narasimha in it. All of these three niches are built like mini temples in themselves having elaborate pillars, base and decoration.

There are numerous ridges onto the temple with different decoration, images having iconic as well as artistic significance. Many of the images depict deities or incidents on Hindu Puranas.

Other temples 
 Kamalja Devi Temple is located beside the lake and also features carved images. Although the water level rises during the rainy season and falls in summer, the temple is located above the water level.
 Gomukh Temple is located along the rim of the crater. A perennial stream emerges from here and pilgrims visiting the temple bathe in the stream. It is also called Sita Nahani temple and Dhara.
 Shankar Ganesh temple, partially submerged and noted for rectangular shiva
 Ram Gaya temple
 Motha Maruti temple is near the Ambar crater lake, with the idol made of rock believed to be fragment of the meteor that created the crater.

Threats to Lonar lake 
Lonar lake faces anthropological and environmental problems as listed below:
 Use of fertilizers, pesticides and toxic materials in the agriculture field around the lake results in pollution of lake water.
 "Dhara", and "Sita Nahani" are perennial streams that are one of the water sources for the lake. They are used for bathing, washing clothes and cattle, and other domestic purposes by the local people, pilgrims, and tourists. The household effluents containing detergents are regularly disposed of here.
 Deforestation is illegally  carried out in the surroundings and cattle grazing inside or near the rim of the crater creates fecal pollution.
 Excavation activities are often carried out illegally thus disturbing the lake's underground water source.
 The government is unable to raise funds needed for preserving this crater and often tourist activities continue to cause environmental damage to nearby land.
 During local festivals such as the Kamala Devi festival, large numbers of pilgrims enter the crater. Small shops and food-stalls are often established near the crater or along its rim.
 Among the frequent visitors are the religious visitors from nearby towns and villages who are not adequately educated by the means of signboards and attending officials about littering and maintaining the beauty of this nationally important destination.
 The lake's ecosystem is being damaged because of the sewage dump in the lake. Marauding pilgrims and increasing pollution is disturbing its substantial flora and fauna with about 100 resident and migratory birds.
 Commercial activities, including illegal construction, within the vicinity of lake has damaged the lake's natural topography.
 According to a research done in 2017, the lead researcher stated "The study found out that reduction in water level is a combined result of drying up of (nearby) percolation dam and the closure of streams (which flow) into the lake."

The crater is protected as a geological landmark and authorities have recognized the role of the historical and archaeological heritage in the lake, nevertheless action is needed to prevent the adverse impact of settlements and religious festivities on the local ecosystem. Various civic activities (e.g. "Save Lonar") for the protection of Lonar crater are on-going.

Gallery 
Panoramic views of Lonar Crater

See also

 Impact craters in India
 Dhala crater in Shivpuri district of Madhya Pradesh
 Luna crater at Kutch district of Gujarat
 Ramgarh Crater in Mangrol tehsil of Baran district of Rajasthan
 Shiva crater, an undersea super crater west of India

 Other related topics
 List of impact craters on Earth
 List of possible impact structures on Earth
 List of lakes in India
 List of national parks of India
 Ramsar Convention
 Soda lake
 Tiger reserves of Maharashtra

References

External links

 Lonar crater, India: an analog for martian impact craters, Lunar and Planetary Science XXXVIII abstracts.
 Lonar, A Gem of Craters SPARK Volume 2, K-12 outreach, Space Science and Engineering Centre, University of Wisc-Madison.
Lonar Lake changes color from green to pink, NASA Earth Observatory, June 19, 2020
 Trekking to Lonar Lake

Archaeological sites in Maharashtra
Buldhana district
Impact craters of India
Lakes of Maharashtra
Vidarbha
National Geological Monuments in India
Pleistocene impact craters
Saline lakes of Asia
Impact crater lakes
Ramsar sites in India